The fourth season of Mayans M.C., an American crime drama, premiered on FX, on April 19, 2022, and concluded on June 14, 2022; it consisted of ten episodes and aired on Tuesdays in the United States. The series was created by Kurt Sutter and Elgin James, takes place in the same fictional universe as Sons of Anarchy, and focuses on a rival motorcycle club.

Production
In May 2021, the series was renewed for a fourth season, which premiered on April 19, 2022.

The season is distributed by Disney-ABC Domestic Television.

Cast and characters

Main
 J. D. Pardo as Ezekiel "EZ" Reyes, a full patch for the Mayans, Santo Padre charter and brother to club member Angel Reyes.
 Clayton Cardenas as Angel Reyes, EZ's brother and Él Secretario of Mayans M.C., Santo Padre Charter 
 Sarah Bolger as Emily Thomas, childhood sweetheart of EZ, who is now married to Miguel Galindo, and the mother of their infant son.
 Michael Irby as Obispo "Bishop" Losa, president of Mayans M.C.'s Santo Padre Charter.
 Carla Baratta as Adelita, who as a child, watched her family die at the hands of the Galindo cartel.
 Richard Cabral as Johnny "El Coco" Cruz, a full patch member of Mayans M.C.
 Raoul Trujillo as Che "Taza" Romero, Vice Presidente of Mayans M.C., Santo Padre Charter. 
 Danny Pino as Miguel Galindo, the son of Galindo Cartel founder Jose Galindo.
 Edward James Olmos as Felipe Reyes, the once-strong Mexican patriarch and Angel and EZ's father.
 Emilio Rivera as Marcus Álvarez, Consejero to Miguel Galindo, former president of the Mayans M.C. Oakland Charter and national president of the Mayans M.C., cousin of Obispo "Bishop" Losa
 Frankie Loyal as Hank "El Tranq" Loza, a former bare-knuckle brawler and El Pacificador (Sgt-at-Arms) of the Mayans M.C., Santo Padre Charter. 
 Joseph Lucero as Neron "Creeper" Vargas, an ex-junkie from Los Angeles and Capitan Del Camino (Road Captain) of the Mayans M.C., Santo Padre Charter. 
 Vincent “Rocco” Vargas as Gilberto "Gilly" Lopez, a former U.S. Army Ranger and a good-natured mixed martial arts (MMA) fighter and a full patch member of the Mayans M.C., Santo Padre Charter.

Special guests
 Manny Montana as Manny, a full patch member of the Mayans M.C., Yuma Charter who befriends EZ.
 Kim Coates as Alex "Tig" Trager, Vice President of SAMCRO, reprising his role from Sons of Anarchy

Recurring
 Gino Vento as Nestor Oceteva, the head of security for the Galindo Cartel and a childhood friend of Miguel's who later becomes a prospect for the Mayans M.C., Santo Padre Charter.
 Emily Tosta as Leticia Cruz, Coco's daughter who was raised by her grandmother Celia for most of her life believing she was his younger sister.
 Jimmy Gonzales as Canche, the Presidente of the Mayans M.C., Yuma Charter and one of the three Kings of the Mayans M.C. 
 Vanessa Giselle as Hope, a heroin addict who forms a close relationship with Coco. She is also a member of Isaac's drug community at Meth Mountain.
 Justina Adorno as Stephanie, also known as "Nails", one of the bartenders at the clubhouse of the Mayans M.C., Santo Padre Charter. She later becomes engaged to Angel after a recurring fling with him.
 Grace Rizzo as Jess, one of the bartenders at the clubhouse of the Mayans M.C., Santo Padre Charter whose sister, Jazmine, is close to a member of SAMDINO. 
 Patricia de Leon as Diana Alvarez, the wife of Marcus Alvarez who lives in Santo Padre with him and their children. 
 Holland Roden as Erin Thomas, Emily Galindo's younger sister, who moves to Santo Padre to live with her and reconnect.
 Greg Vrotsos as Terry, the Vice President of SAMDINO who seeks to start a war with the Mayans. 
 Guillermo García as Ignacio, more commonly known as "El Banquero" (The Banker), the leader of Lobos Nueva Generación (LNG), a radical organization made up of the remnants of the Lobos Sonora Cartel, who were previously defeated by the Galindo Cartel under Jose Galindo. 
 Andrea Cortés as Sofia, an employee at an animal shelter who helps EZ adopt a dog, Sally. 
 Stella Maeve as Kody, an ex-junkie who befriends Creeper at an NA meeting. 
 Greg Serano as Jay-Jay, an ex-convict who EZ was associated with whilst in prison. 
 CM Punk as Paul, a former US Army Ranger and close friend of Gilly.
 Sulem Calderon as Gabriela "Gaby" Castillo, EZ's girlfriend until she leaves him to move to Lodi to attend nursing school.

Guest
 Efrat Dor as Anna Linares, a government agent working with Lincoln Potter in the investigation of the Mayans and Los Olvidados.

Episodes

Notes

References

External links
 
 

2022 American television seasons
Sons of Anarchy